Jar of Kingdom is the debut album by Australian progressive metal band, Alchemist. The band recorded the album after receiving a record contract in the mail from Austrian label Lethal Records and was released by that company in October 1993. During the recording of the first track "Abstraction", vocalist Adam Agius damaged his voice, thus resulting in the raw vocal sound on the rest of the album. The name "Jar of Kingdom" was inspired by a comment by television personality and entertainer Graham Kennedy during a comedy skit, in which he described a vial of pig semen as a "jar of kingdom". Jar of Kingdom featured early experiments with synthesisers, acoustic guitars and samples: "Whale" includes the sample of a humpback whale song. All tracks from this album except "Wandering and Wondering" and "Whale" later appeared on the Embryonics compilation.

The album was dedicated to the memory of John Munns and David Carter.

Track listing
All tracks by Alchemist

Credits

Band members
 Adam Agius − vocals, guitar
 Rodney Holder − drums, (triangle on tracks 4 and 8)
 John Bray − bass guitar
 Roy Torkington − guitar, artwork, layout and design

Guest musicians
 Michelle Klemke − female vocals (tracks 2 and 6)

Production
 Mixed at Rich Music Studios, Sydney, Australia in February 1993
 Engineered by Brett Stanton
 Produced by Alchemist and Brett Stanton
 Band photos by Eddie
 Cover artwork and computer graphics by Christian Ruff
 Booklet design by Michael Piesch

Re-release 99

In 1999, Jar of Kingdom was remastered and re-released by Thrust and distributed by Shock Records in Australia. The album was offered to the label by the band in order for them to be released from their contract to enable them to seek international distribution with other companies. This re-released version was a compilation of the original album together with Alchemist's demo of 1991.

Demo '91 tracks

All songs by Alchemist

Credits for re-release
 Adam Agius - vocals, guitar
 Rodney Holder - drums
 John Bray - bass
 Andrew Meredith - guitar (demo tracks only)
 Roy Torkington - guitar, artwork, layout and design

References

1993 debut albums
Alchemist (band) albums
1999 compilation albums